MBIS may refer to:
Mbis, ceremonial pole from New Guinea
Marist Brothers International School, school in Kobe, Japan

See also
MBI (disambiguation)